Dudley Charles "Doug" Probyn (1 October 1912 – 13 December 2005) was an Australian rules footballer who played with St Kilda in the Victorian Football League (VFL).

Probyn was recruited to St. Kilda via Prahan FC after playing in their 1940 VFA grand final loss to Port Melbourne.

Probyn coached the Wodonga Football Club in 1945, winning the club best and fairest award  and also the Border Football Association best and fairest award, The Border Mail Medal in 1945.

Probyn then won the 1949 - K J Azzi Medal in the Hume Football League when playing the Brocklesby Football Club

Probyn also won the Benalla & District Football League's best and fairest award as captain of the Tolmie Football Club in 1952.

Probyn played with Milawa in the Ovens & King Football League in 1953, kicking 17 goals for the season.

Notes

External links 

Dudley Probyn's playing statistics from The VFA Project

1945 - Wodonga Football Club - Team Photo
1945 - Mangoplah & Wodonga FC team photos
1949 - Hume Football League Best & Fairest - Azzi Medalist: Doug Probyn

1912 births
2005 deaths
Australian rules footballers from Victoria (Australia)
St Kilda Football Club players
Prahran Football Club players
South Sydney Football Club players